WTIB (103.7 FM) is a radio station in Eastern North Carolina that airs a talk format. WTIB is licensed in Williamston, North Carolina.

History
The station signed on in the late 60s or early 70s as WIAM-FM running a Top 40 format and simulcasting with then sister station WIAM (AM). WIAM-FM became WSEC, then WKKE "Key 103.7", owned by Mega Media. Seacomm bought the station and changed it to WHTE "Hot 104", also moving the station to Greenville. Gray Communications bought WHTE and changed it to Contemporary Christian using the CBN Network format. In 1991 WHTE began simulcasting with 95.9, switching to CHR as The Hot FM. The stations separated in 1993 with 103.7 WHTE playing Hip Hop music, until 1994 when they switched again to "Z 103.7" FM. On April 24, 1995, they hooked up with 96.3 and together they were playing Top 40 music. On April 25, 2007 the stations switched to "Thunder Country" on 103.7 FM. On March 15, 2010, 103.7 FM became the new home of WTIB, a talk radio station which was on 94.3.

References

External links

TIB
Talk radio stations in the United States
Radio stations established in 1987
1987 establishments in North Carolina